Academia Sinica (AS,), headquartered in Nangang, Taipei, is the national academy of the Republic of China (Taiwan). Founded in Nanking, the academy supports research activities in a wide variety of disciplines, ranging from mathematical and physical sciences, to life sciences, and to humanities and social sciences. As an educational institute, it provides PhD training and scholarship through its English-language Taiwan International Graduate Program in biology, agriculture, chemistry, physics, informatics, and earth and environmental sciences. 

Academia Sinica is ranked 144th in Nature Publishing Index - 2014 Global Top 200 and 18th in Reuters World's Most Innovative Research Institutions of 2019. The current president since 2016 is James C. Liao, an expert in metabolic engineering, systems biology and synthetic biology.

History

Academia Sinica, which means "Chinese Academy", was founded in 1928 in Nanking, then capital of the Republic of China, with its first meeting held in Shanghai. By December 1948, all fourteen institutes of the Academia Sinica had agreed to move from Nanking to Taiwan alongside other institutions of the government of the Republic of China as a result of the Chinese Civil War. In the end, only the Academia Sinica's Institute of History and Philology was relocated to Taiwan, because the head of the Institute of Mathematics, Jiang Lifu, resigned his position in June 1949, and never traveled to Taiwan.

Of the 81 inaugural research fellows appointed by the Academia Sinica prior to its move, nine crossed the Taiwan Strait. The institution was low on monetary funds, and reopened with the Institute of History and Philology in December 1954. Due to the importance of agriculture to the economy of Taiwan, efforts were made to revive the Institute of Botany. The second convocation of the Academia Sinica was held in 1957. At the same time, the mainland part of Academia Sinica remained functioning under Communist rule and was renamed as the Chinese Academy of Sciences in the 1980s.

In the 2000s, many of the current institutes and research centers were established, partially through reorganization of old ones. Academia Sinica's first PhD program, the Taiwan International Graduate Program, was inaugurated in 2006.

Mission 
As the preeminent academic research institution in Taiwan, Academia Sinica is directly responsible to the Presidential Office, unlike other government-sponsored research institutes which are responsible to relevant Executive Yuan ministries. Thus AS enjoys autonomy in formulating its own research objectives. In addition to academic research on various subjects in the sciences and humanities, its major tasks also include providing guidelines, channels of coordination, and incentives with a view to raising academic standards in the country.

Leadership

The president of Academia Sinica is appointed by the President of ROC from three candidates recommended by the Council Meeting. The president of Academia Sinica must be an Academician. After the appointment, the president serves a five-year term and can serve up to two consecutive terms.

Academia Sinica's current President is James C. Liao, a biochemist, who replaced Chi-Huey Wong, a biological chemist and the Parsons Foundation Professor and Chair of the Department of Chemical and Biomolecular Engineering at the University of California, Los Angeles, as the 11th president on 21 June 2016. The list of past Presidents also includes Hu Shih, a philosopher and essayist, and a key contributor to Chinese liberalism and language reform in his advocacy for the use of vernacular Chinese, as well as an influential redology scholar and holder of the Jiaxu manuscript until his death. The fifth president, Yuan T. Lee, won the Nobel Prize in Chemistry for "contributions to the dynamics of chemical elementary processes".

Presidents
 Cai Yuanpei (1928–1940)
 Chu Chia-Hua (Acting, 1940–1957)
 Hu Shih (1958–1962)
 Wang Shih-Chieh (1962–1970)
 Chien Shih-Liang (1970–1983) 
 Wu Ta-You (1983–1994) 
 Yuan T. Lee (1994–2006)
 Chi-Huey Wong (2006–2016)
 James C. Liao (2016–)

Convocation

The Convocation of Academia Sinica consists of 281 Academicians, including 105 domestic and 176 overseas appointed scientists. Seven Academicians of Academia Sinica are Nobel laureates. Academician membership is an honorary lifetime privilege without remuneration. They do not necessarily perform research or reside at the Academia Sinica campus. According to their own expertise, academicians are grouped into three divisions: Mathematics and Physical Sciences, Life Sciences, and Social Sciences and Humanities. A maximum number of ten new members is allocated to each of the three divisions during the biennial convocation. The eligibility of the academicians is not restricted to the residents of Taiwan or Republic of China citizens. More than half of the academicians are overseas scholars and scientists.

At the convocation, the academicians elect new academicians and honorary academicians, and elect members to the Council of Academia Sinica. The convocation can also recommend policies to the government on academic research. The academicians also have responsibilities to carry out research at the government's request, although the government has never requested any task.

Academicians
Academicians are elected annually, with nominations open in July and ending in October. Outcome of election to academicians are publicly announced in July the following year. Election to the academy is regarded a national honor in Taiwan. Up until the 34th convocation of academicians in 2022, any scientist of Chinese descent could be elected a member of Academia Sinica. Starting in 2023, election is to be restricted to citizens of the Republic of China. This change led Academia Sinica to discuss formally classifying non-Taiwanese members as honorary or foreign members. Such a classification system would require amendments to the Organic Act of the Academia Sinica. A group of academicians proposed that membership be further restricted to Taiwan passport or national identification card holders.

Academicians who reside(d) at Academia Sinica

Academicians who are Nobel Prize laureates
 Yuan T. Lee (chemistry 1986)
 Steven Chu (physics 1997)
Daniel C. Tsui (physics 1998)

Academicians who reside overseas

Campuses 

Academia Sinica has its main campus located in Nangang, Taipei, and runs over 40 research stations distributed across the country and throughout the world.

Main campus 
In addition to the Central Office of Administration and 28 institutes and research centers, the main campus has 10 museums or memorial halls open to the public, as well as an ecological pond, a forest park, a Tudigong temple (Fude Temple ), and Sifen Creek, which runs through the campus and to the north by the National Biotechnology Research Park.

National Biotechnology Research Park 
The National Biotechnology Research Park, finished in 2017 and inaugurated in October 2018 by Taiwanese President Tsai Ing-wen, is located about 500 m north of the main campus and 500 m south of the Nankang Software Park, with the Nangang station to the west and the Taipei Nangang Exhibition Center MRT station to the east. It is home to four Academia Sinica centers for translational medicine, innovation, incubation, and bioinformatics service, as well as the Biotechnology Development Center of the Ministry of Economic Affairs, the Food and Drug Administration of the Ministry of Health and Welfare, and the National Laboratory Animal Center of the Ministry of Science and Technology.

National Taiwan University main campus 
Three physical sciences institutes, Mathematics, Astronomy, and Atomic and Molecular Sciences, are located in the main campus of National Taiwan University in Gongguan, Daan, Taipei. A joint office between the two institutions was established in 2014.

Southern Campus 
A campus in the Shalun Smart Green Energy Science City, near the Tainan High Speed Rail station, Guiren District, Tainan, is under construction and is expected to be finished in 2021. The groundbreaking ceremony took place in May 2018 after seven years of planning. The Southern Campus is part of an effort to promote regional balance in the academic landscape of Taiwan and will prioritize research on agricultural biotechnology, sustainable development, and archaeology of early Taiwanese history and culture.

Organization

Institutes and research centers
Similar to the Max Planck Institutes of Germany, Taiwan's Academia Sinica covers three major academic divisions:

Research stations
The research stations in Taiwan include:
Southern Taiwan Science Park Archaeological Station
Green Island Marine Station
Yuanyang Lake Station, Jianshi, Hsinchu
Marine Research Station, Jiaosi, Yilan
Dongsha Atoll Research Station, Kaohsiung

The research sites abroad include:
Global Navigation Satellite System (GNSS), Luzon, the Philippines
Sesoko Station, Okinawa, Japan
Yuan Tseh Lee Array (YTLA), Mauna Loa, Hawaii, United States
South-East Asian Time Series Study (SEATS) on the Southeast Asian Sea

Education programs

PhD programs

Joint PhD programs
In general Academia Sinica is a non-teaching institution, but it has very close collaboration with the top research universities in Taiwan, such as National Taiwan University, National Tsing Hua University, National Yang Ming Chiao Tung University and National Central University. Many research fellows from Academia Sinica have a second appointment or joint professorship at these universities. In addition, Academia Sinica established joint PhD programs in biological sciences with Taiwan's universities, such as the Doctoral Degree Program in Marine Biotechnology with National Taiwan Ocean University. Through these mechanisms, the faculty at Academia Sinica give lecture courses and supervise graduate students.

Taiwan International Graduate Program

Since 2002, Academia Sinica set up the Taiwan International Graduate Program (TIGP), open to local and international students for PhD programs. All courses at TIGP are conducted in English. Students can choose their advisor among a faculty selected for the program out of outstanding researchers and professors appointed at Academia Sinica or at one of the partner universities (or both). Currently, admittance to the programme guarantees a monthly stipend of 34,000 NTD, roughly $1,200 or €1,050. Applications can normally be sent starting in December and the submission deadline is usually set on March 31, for enrollment in September of the same year. Lectures start around the middle of September and end around the middle of June, with slight variations mostly depending on the partner university's academic calendar.

The TIGP offers PhD programs only in selected disciplines agreed upon by Academia Sinica and its national research universities partners. The program offers doctoral degrees in highly interdisciplinary areas in the physical sciences, applied sciences, engineering, biological and agricultural sciences, health and medical sciences, humanities and social sciences. As of March 2017, Academia Sinica administers 12 such programs with degrees issued from partner universities:
 Chemical Biology and Molecular Biophysics
 Molecular Science and Technology
 Molecular and Biological Agricultural Sciences
 Bioinformatics
 Molecular and Cell Biology 
 Nano Science and Technology
 Molecular Medicine
 Earth System Science
 Biodiversity 
 Interdisciplinary Neuroscience 
 Sustainable Chemical Science and Technology 
 Social Network and Human-Centered Computing

Predoctoral programs

TIGP International Internship Program
Launched in 2009, the TIGP International Internship Program (TIGP-IIP) is an intensive, predoctoral, summer research training program for two months that prepares its participating interns with the necessary knowledge and skills for future research or career development through rigorous hands-on training. Successful applicants from around the world will receive for each month a stipend of 30,000 NTD and a round-trip ticket to Taiwan. The program highlights include internship at an applicant-chosen host lab, visits to Academia Sinica facilities and partner institutions, field trips in Taiwan and basic Mandarin lessons.

Summer internship programs
Many institutes of Academia Sinica offers their own summer internship programs for undergraduate students in Taiwan.

High school program
Academia Sinica also offers a three-year program for gifted and talented high school students interested in the biological sciences. To enroll, students must first pass an entrance exam at the start of 10th grade (first year for Taiwanese senior high schools). During 10th grade, students attend expert lectures and visit the various laboratories on campus. During 11th and 12th grade, students enter a lab of their choice and gain hands-on experience in the various fields of biological sciences. To graduate from the program, an academic paper must be submitted and presented in front of professors and peers.

Postdoctoral scholars 
Academia Sinica has a high number of both domestic and international postdoctoral fellows. They are funded by grants of Ministry of Science and Technology (Taiwan) or by Academia Sinica. The latter, the Academia Sinica Postdoctoral Fellow Program, consists of two tracks: Regular Postdoctoral Scholars (starting annual salary: NT$810,351 (US$28,100), additional benefits depending on the principal investigator) and Academia Sinica Postdoctoral Scholars (annual salary up to NT$ 1,167,278 (US$40,000), plus round-trip ticket and research subsidy of US$4,500)

International cooperation 
The institute has extensive cooperation with research and academic institutions from other countries (such as Harvard-Yenching Institute) and hosts several foreign institutes and their scholars.

France 
The Taipei Center of the French EFEO (L'École française d'Extrême-Orient; French School of Asian Studies) was hosted by the Institute of Modern History, AS, from 1992 to 1996 and since 1996 by the Institute of History and Philology. Its research projects center on the local and cultural history of Taiwan and China, and it organizes conferences and talks, support visiting scholars and students, and hosts EFEO fellows.

Journals associated with Academia Sinica
Academia Sinica currently sponsors the following journals:
Botanical Studies
Zoological Studies
Language and Linguistics
Statistica Sinica
Academia Sinica Law Journal
Taiwan Journal of Anthropology
Academia Economic Papers
Bulletin of the Institute of Modern History, Academia Sinica
Journal of Social Sciences and Philosophy

See also

List of universities in Taiwan
Max Planck Institutes
Tang K. Tang

References

Further reading
 Levinson, David et al. eds. The Encyclopedia of Modern Asia  (6 vol Thomson-Gale, 2002) 1:9–.

External links

 Official website /
 Taiwan International Graduate Program (TIGP)

 
Taiwan
Taiwan
Education in Taiwan
Scientific organizations established in 1928
Members of the International Council for Science
Members of the International Science Council